This Norma Talmadge filmography excludes numerous shorts from 1910 to 1915, starting with A Broken Spell. It is ordered in chronological order by release date, according to IMDb. However, the list of Greta de Groat, Electronic Media Cataloger at Stanford University Libraries, disagrees with that order in some instances.

References

External links
 

Actress filmographies
American filmographies